The Taipei National University of the Arts (TNUA) is a national university in Guandu, Beitou District, Taipei, Taiwan.

History
The preparatory committees to establish the school was formed on 22 October 1980. The National Institute of the Arts was then founded on 1 July 1982 as an institute of higher learning for the arts. The institute was housed in Luzhou, Taipei County (now New Taipei City), from 1985 until its relocation in 1991 to its permanent campus in Kuandu, Taipei. The institute was renamed Taipei National University of the Arts in 2001.

Faculties
School of Music 
School of Fine Arts 
School of Theatre Arts 
School of Dance 
School of Film and New Media 
School of Cultural Resources 
School of Humanities
Music and Image Trans-disciplinary Program

Research Centers
Center for Traditional Arts 
Center for Art and Technology 
Performing Arts Center 
Center for Arts Resources & Educational Outreach

Presidents
 (July 1982 – July 1991)
Ma Shui-long (August 1991 – August 1994)
Liu S. Lian (September 1994 – August 1997)
Chiu Kun-liang (October 1997 – January 2006)
 (August 2006 – July 2013)
Yang Chyi-wen (August 2013 – July 2017)
Chen Kai-huang (since August 2017)

Campus
The campus buildings are designed in a neo-Chinese classical style. Aside from the colleges and departments, the university houses a Music Hall, the Performing Arts Center, including a theater hall  and a dance recital hall, the Kuandu Museum of Fine Arts, a library, an Olympic-size swimming pool, the Center for the Study of Traditional Arts, a computer center and the Center for the Study of Art and Technology.

Events
Festivals organized by TNUA or using its campus:
Guandu Arts Festival
Guandu Flower Festival (Guandu Flower Art Festival)
Kuandu Film Festival
Kuandu International Animation Festival
Kuandu Lights Festival

International and local cooperation

Name censorship
In 2016, the Hong Kong Government's Leisure and Cultural Services Department was criticized as in breach of freedom of expression for blocking use of the university name in any form that included the word 'National'/'國立'.  
The department, responsible for most of the territory's arts venues, told TNUA graduate Law Shuk-yin, an art administrator and executive producer for drama company The Nonsensemakers, that she could not use the name in her biography in promotional material for her production at a theatre it managed.

Honorary doctors of art 
Notable Honorary Doctors of Art from TNUA include cellist and conductor Mstislav Rostropovich, composer Ma Shui-long, choreographer Lin Hwai-min, and theatrical set designer Ming Cho Lee.

Notable alumni
 Hsiao Ya-chuan, film director
 Hsieh Ying-hsuan, actress
 Jacklyn Wu, actress
 Huang Kuo-shu, member of Legislative Yuan
 Jag Huang, actor
 Jian Man-shu, actress, screenwriter and director
 Kaiser Chuang, actor
 Lin Jeng-yi, Director of National Palace Museum (2016–2018)
 Wu Kuo-chu, Taiwanese choreographer

See also
 List of universities in Taiwan

References

External links

 國立臺北藝術大學 
 Taipei National University of the Arts

 
1982 establishments in Taiwan
Art schools in Taiwan
Educational institutions established in 1982
Drama schools in Taiwan
Universities and colleges in Taipei
Music schools in Taiwan
Universities and colleges in Taiwan